Hesperorhipis is a genus of beetles in the family Buprestidae, containing the following species:

 Hesperorhipis albofasciata Fall, 1930
 Hesperorhipis hyperbola Knull, 1938
 Hesperorhipis jacumbae Knull, 1954
 Hesperorhipis mirabilis Knull, 1937

References

Buprestidae genera